The 2023 24 Hours of Daytona (formally the 2023 Rolex 24 at Daytona) was an endurance sports car race sanctioned by the International Motor Sports Association (IMSA). The event was held at Daytona International Speedway combined road course in Daytona Beach, Florida, on January 28–29, 2023. This event was the 61st running of the 24 Hours of Daytona since its inception in 1962, and the first of 11 races across multiple classes in the 2023 IMSA SportsCar Championship, as well as the first of four rounds in the 2023 Michelin Endurance Cup. The No.60 Meyer Shank Racing Acura, driven by Tom Blomqvist, Colin Braun, Hélio Castroneves and Simon Pagenaud, took the overall win, but were later penalized for tire pressure data manipulation, resulting in penalties, fines and probation for those responsible. This was Meyer Shank's second Rolex 24 win in a row, and their third in four events.

Entry list

The list of entries for the 24-hour race consisted of 61 cars across five classes, equaling the number from the previous year's race. There were nine entries in Grand Touring Prototype (GTP), 10 entries in Le Mans Prototype 2 (LMP2), nine entries in LMP3, and 33 entries across both GT Daytona classes, with nine entered in GTD Pro and 24 entered in GTD.

The 2023 24 Hours of Daytona saw the competition debut of LMDh regulations - run as Grand Touring Prototype - as the top class of the series, replacing the previous Daytona Prototype International regulations. Four manufacturers entered the class for its inaugural race. Acura and Cadillac, both present during the DPi era, continued their prototype programs by joining LMDh. Acura, with their ARX-06, entered two cars, one operated by Wayne Taylor Racing with Andretti Autosport, and the other by Meyer Shank Racing with Curb-Agajanian. Cadillac, with their V-LMDh, entered three cars, two for Chip Ganassi Racing (operating as Cadillac Racing), and one for Whelen Engineering Racing. Also joining the LMDh class are Porsche and BMW. Porsche, entering with their 963, partnered with Team Penske to enter two cars into the race. BMW, entered with the M Hybrid V8, promoted their longtime GT racing partners Rahal Letterman Lanigan Racing to running their LMDh program.

In the GTD classes, both Porsche and Ferrari had new GT3 spec cars making their debut. Porsche entered with several of the 992 version of the 911 GT3, including with defending GTD Pro champion Pfaff Motorsports and defending GTD race winners Wright Motorsports. Ferrari's 296 GT3 made its competition debut as well, with entered teams including longtime Ferrari customers AF Corse and Risi Competizione.

Roar Before the 24
The qualifying race at the Roar as held in 2021 and 2022 has been removed from the format for 2023.

Daytona 24 relevant activity at the Roar weekend includes load-in, media day, scrutineering, and five (5) practice sessions.

Qualifying 
Qualifying was held on Sunday, January 22. Due to heavy rainfall during the previous night's practice sessions and software changes made by IMSA, cars in the GTP class were given an extra 15-minute session prior to the start of qualifying.

Qualifying was broken into four sessions. The first was for cars in the GTD Pro and GTD classes. Mercedes-AMG cars dominated the session, taking the top four spots overall and claiming pole position in both classes, with the No. 79 WeatherTech Racing entry driven by Maro Engel earning pole in GTD Pro and the No. 57 Winward Racing entry driven by Philip Ellis setting the fastest time among all GTD entries. The best non-Mercedes entry was the No. 23 Heart of Racing Team Aston Martin driven by Ross Gunn. Porsche, with a new rendition of their GT3 car, struggled during qualifying, with their best qualified car being the No. 16 Wright Motorsports entry in 21st position among GTD cars, 2.8 seconds behind the fastest lap.

The second session was for cars in the LMP3 class. Nico Pino qualified on pole for the class driving the No. 33 car for Sean Creech Motorsport, besting Dakota Dickerson in the No. 36 entry from Andretti Autosport.

The third session of qualifying was for cars in the LMP2 class. For this class, IMSA mandated that the driver holding a bronze rating from the FIA (indicating amateur status) on each team qualify the car. Ben Keating qualified on pole driving the No. 52 car for PR1/Mathiasen Motorsports, with over a second gap to any other car. The session was shortened significantly by two separate incidents the occurred at the same time. John Farano, driving the No. 8 Tower Motorsports entry, crashed heavily at the Le Mans chicane, causing significant damage. At the same time, Fred Poordad, driving the No. 55 Proton Competition entry, crashed at turn 6, causing damage to the front end of his car. For causing the red flag, both the No. 8 and the No. 55 had their best two times from the session deleted.

The final session of qualifying was for the GTP class. The session was the first official session for the new class in IMSA competition. Tom Blomqvist qualified on pole driving the No. 60 car for Meyer Shank Racing, beating Felipe Nasr in the No. 7 Porsche Penske Motorsport entry by less than one tenth of a second. All cars in the class qualified within one second of the pole time. The session saw one incident when Nick Tandy, driving the No. 6 Porsche Penske Motorsport entry, crashed at the Le Mans chicane. Tandy had his best two laps from the session deleted for causing a red flag, effectively leaving him with no time set.

Qualifying results 

 The No. 57 Winward Racing entry initially qualified on pole position for the GTD class. However, the car suffered a major accident during post-qualifying practice, forcing the team to move to a back-up car. By IMSA rules, the entry was moved to the rear of the GTD field on the starting grid. Additionally, Lucas Auer, the driver of the car at the time of the accident, suffered lumbar injuries and was forced out of the race. Daniel Morad was signed as his injury replacement.
 The No. 64 TGM/TF Sport entry and the No. 19 Iron Lynx entry were both moved to the back of their class for starting the race with a different driver than who qualified.
 The No. 8 Tower Motorsports entry had its two fastest laps deleted as penalty for causing a red flag during its qualifying session.
 The No. 55 Proton Competition entry had its two fastest laps deleted as penalty for causing a red flag during its qualifying session.
 The No. 6 Porsche Penske Motorsport entry had its two fastest laps deleted as penalty for causing a red flag during its qualifying session.

Race

Start and early hours

Racing began at 1:40 p.m. EST. Tom Blomqvist in the No. 60 Meyer Shank Racing Acura took the early lead. The race quickly saw its first full course caution period when the No. 8 Tower Motorsports Oreca, one of the favorites in the LMP2 category, came to a halt with mechanical problems on the first lap. When racing resumed again, Blomqvist moved into the lead once more, while the No. 10 Wayne Taylor Racing Acura and the No. 6 Porsche Penske Motorsport Porsche battled for 2nd. At the close of the first hour, the No. 25 BMW M Team RLL BMW became the first of the GTP cars to encounter problems, as it pulled off the track and into the garage. The No. 25 would not return to the track for over three hours. In the lower classes, the No. 52 PR1/Mathiasen Motorsports Oreca led in LMP2, the No. 74 Tiley Motorsports Ligier led in LMP3, the No. 23 Heart of Racing Team Aston Martin led in GTD Pro, and the No. 93 Racers' Edge Motorsports Acura led in GTD.

During the second stint of the race, the No. 60, now driven by Colin Braun, was challenged by the No. 01 and No 02 Cadillac Racing entries, with the No. 01 eventually overtaking and holding the lead at the three hour mark of the race. This came as the race was interrupted by another full course yellow near the start of the third hour, as the No. 42 NTE Sport Lambroghini suffered an accident at turn one. In the LMP3 class, the No. 74, one of the favorites for class victory, suffered an engine failure, forcing its retirement from the race. The No. 13 AWA Duqueine inherited the lead after that 74's misfortune. In the GTD ranks, the No. 3 Corvette Racing Chevrolet, driven by Jordan Taylor, moved forward and took the lead in the GTD Pro class, while the No. 93 remained in the lead of GTD. Hour 4 saw another interruption, as the No. 96 Turner Motorsport BMW came to a halt on track with driveline issues, dropping them far down the order. After the full course caution, the No. 60 reclaimed the overall lead, while further back, the No. 33 Sean Creech Motorsports Ligier took the lead in LMP3 and the No. 32 Team Korthoff Motorsports Mercedes moved to the lead of GTD, despite an incident with a prototype in the previous hour.

Night
During the fifth hour, the No. 60 fell behind the No. 10 during pit stops. As the 60, now driven by Simon Pagenaud, attempted to catch back up, it made contact with the No. 8 Tower Motorsports Oreca, sending it spinning. Scott Dixon in the No. 01 Cadillac stopped to avoid hitting the spinning car, but behind him, the No. 13 AWA LMP3 was unable to react in time and ran into the back of Dixon. The incident sent both the 01 and 13 to the pits for repairs, with the 13 falling three laps behind the LMP3 leader. The No. 7 Porsche also suffered issues, with energy warnings forcing it into the garage for over 30 minutes. In the LMP2 class, the lead became contested by the No. 52 PR1/Mathiasen Motorsports, the No. 11 TDS Racing, and the No. 55 Proton Competition Orecas, with the 11 leading by the end of hour 6. However, the No. 11 would come to strife in the seventh hour, as drive Steven Thomas made contact with a GTD car at the Le Mans chicane, which sent him into the wall and ultimately ended the car's race. After a round of pit stops, the No. 31 Whelen Engineering Racing Cadillac, driven by Pipo Derani, led the race for the first time, while the No. 60, now drive by Hélio Castroneves, was second. On the restart, Castroneves attempted to pass for the lead, but lost control and spun, dropping him to the rear of the GTP field and forcing him to make an unscheduled pit stop for new tires. Derani led the race until the next pit cycle, where it was jumped by the No. 02 Cadillac Racing entry. PR1/Mathiasen Motorsport led in LMP2 after the demise of the No. 11, while the No. 23 Heart of Racing Team Aston Martin moved to the lead of GTD Pro.

The ninth hour saw another full course yellow after a tire barrier became dislodged and dragged partially onto the racing surface. The No. 01 Cadillac inherited the lead after choosing not to pit, with the car off-sequence from the rest of the GTP field due to its earlier incident. The caution period also allowed the No. 60 to catch back up to the rest of the GTP field and recover from their earlier spin. With pit stops rearrange the running order, the No. 14 Vasser Sullivan Racing Lexus moved to the GTD Pro lead for the first time, while the No. 93 Racers' Edge Motorsports Acura returned to the GTD lead. Racing lasted only 30 minutes before another full course yellow came, this time for the No. 92 Kelly-Moss Porsche, which pulled to the side of the road at turn two with an engine failure. After pit stops, the No. 31 Cadillac led the race, while behind, the No. 60 moved into second on the restart with the No. 6 Porsche Penske Motorsports entry in third. By the end of 11 hours, the No. 60 was back in the lead. In LMP3, Nico Pino in the No. 33 Sean Creech Motorsports entry and Nicolás Varrone in the No. 17 AWA entry began battling for the lead, with the 33 eventually coming out on top. The GTD classes remained hotly contested, with the No. 57 Winward Racing Mercedes and the No. 70 Inception Racing McLaren both taking the lead for the first time during the race in the night.

The race reached its halfway point under full course caution, as the No. 43 MRS GT-Racing Ligier caught fire and stopped on the track. During the caution, the No. 60 came into the pit lane to investigate an oil leak in the gearbox. The team never fully fixed this gearbox issue and continued to the finish with some leakage continuing. The No. 10 Wayne Taylor Racing Acura suffered a broken oil fill tube during this caution, which cost them a lap to the leader repairing The pit stop dropped the 60 down to third, with the No. 6 Porsche taking the lead. The 60 returned to the lead shortly after the restart. The leaders remained largely unchanged until the next caution period in the 15th hour, when the No. 64 TGM/TF Sport Aston Martin came to a halt on track. The No. 60 once again pitted for its gearbox, promoting the No. 6 Porsche back to the lead. In LMP2, the No. 04 CrowdStrike Racing Oreca, driven by Ben Hanley moved into the lead, with the No. 35 TDS Racing entry in second. In the GT cars, the No. 79 WeatherTech Racing Mercedes returned to the lead for lead in GTD Pro, while the No. 27 Heart of Racing Team Aston Martin moved to the GTD lead.

The No. 01 Cadillac moved into the lead just before the 16th hour. The No. 6 Porsche suffered a high-speed spin in the infield section, causing damage to the bodywork of the car and costing it several laps in repair. Issues also hit the No. 31 Whelen Engineering Cadillac, as suspension damage sidelined the car for over 30 minutes. By sunrise, the battle for the overall lead was between the No. 01 Cadillac and the No. 60 Acura. The No. 35 TDS Racing Oreca took the lead of LMP2, while the battle between the No. 33 and No. 17 in LMP3 continued. In GTs, the No. 79 retained the lead of GTD Pro, while the No. 57 Winward Racing Mercedes moved to the lead of the GTD. The No. 23 Heart of Racing Team Aston Martin fell out of the fight for the GTD Pro lead after suffering susepnsion damage.

Morning

The No. 01 Cadillac continued to lead into the morning hours. The fight for the LMP3 lead came to a sudden end when the No. 33 Sean Creech Motorsports entry pitted at the 19 hour mark with gearbox problems, dropping it 17 laps behind the No. 17. In GTD, the No. 27 Heart of Racing Aston Martin suffered a brief setback as an electrical problem caused the car to come to a halt on course, dropping it out of the GTD battle for the time.

The 21st hour saw a full course caution for the first time in nearly six hours, as the No. 20 High Class Racing Oreca, driven by Anders Fjordbach, lost control and crashed heavily at the Le Mans Chicane. The caution allowed the No. 60 to catch back up to the No. 01, as well as bringing the No. 02 back into the fray. The yellow also benefited the No. 27, allowing it to recover from its earlier problems. At the restart, the No. 60, now driven again by Pagenaud, moved into the lead, while behind, the No. 04 returned to the lead of LMP2 and the No. 27 recovered back to the front of GTD. Racing continued for 30 minutes before dramas struck the No. 6 Porsche, which trailed smoke from the rear of the car before coming to a stop before the Le Mans Chicane. A full course yellow was called for the stricken car, and the No. 6 retired from the race with gearbox failure. The LMP2 battle tightened up in the final hours, with several cars on the lead lap and the No. 88 AF Corse entry taking the lead with two hours remaining.

Finish
Two full course cautions in the penultimate hour slowed racing, the first for the No. 64 TGM/TF Sport Aston Martin, which came to a halt with suspension damage at turn six, and the second on the restart for the No. 52 PR1/Mathiasen Motorsports Oreca, which spun and stalled at turn three. The cautions helped to bring the No. 10 Wayne Taylor Racing Acura back in with a chance at the overall win, as it finally recovered from its repairs during the night. The cautions also brought together the GTD fields, with the GTD Pro battle becoming between the No. 79 WeatherTech Racing Mercedes, the No. 3 Corvette Racing Chevrolet, and the No. 14 Vasser Sullivan Racing Lexus. The GTD battle was between five different cars. When racing resumed, the No. 60 once again took off with the lead.

With 53 minutes remaining, the No. 87 FastMD Racing Duqueine came to a halt on track, necessitating another full course caution. During this caution, most of the field came into the pit lane to make their final refueling stops. Racing resumed with 35 minutes to go, but the restart was chaotic in the GTD field. The No. 57 Winward Racing Mercedes, battling for the GTD win, made contact with the No. 3 Corvette and was shoved into the wall at turn one, breaking the 57's suspension. As the remaining cars tried to pass the slow No. 57, another incident occurred at turn three between the No. 77 VOLT Racing Porsche, the No. 21 AF Corse Ferrari, and the No. 80 AO Racing Team Porsche. The incidents left debris strewn across the track and caused the retirements of both the 57 and the 21, leading to the final full course caution period of the race.

The final restart came with 27 minutes remaining. Once again, the No. 60 took off in front, but now with the No. 10 pursuing. The No. 60 would not be caught, and Meyer Shank Racing won, their second consecutive victory in the event and the first victory ever for the LMDh cars. It was the third consecutive victory for Castroneves, and the second consecutive for Pagenaud and Blomqvist. The LMP2 race became a battle between the No. 04 CrowdStrike Racing entry and the No. 55 Proton Competition entry. The LMP2 battle was the most dramatic finish in the field, with the No. 55, driven by James Allen making the pass for the win in a photo finish decided by 0.016 second. In the LMP3 class, the No. 17 AWA Duqueine cruised to victory in the class with a 12 lap lead over their nearest competitor and having been unchallenged since the gearbox issues for the No. 33 in the morning hours. In GTD Pro, the No. 79 WeatherTech Racing Mercedes, driven to the finish by Maro Engel, held off the No. 3 Corvette for victory. In the GTD class, the No. 27 Heart of Racing Aston Martin took victory over the No. 44 Magnus Racing Aston Martin and was the best placed of all GTD cars in the field despite its Pro-Am driver lineup.

Post-race 
On March 8, 2023, after being noticed by Honda Performance Development, IMSA announced that the race-winning No.60 Meyer Shank Racing Acura ARX-06 entry was penalized for manipulating tire pressure data during the race and running under the minimum pressure set by Michelin. Although the win and its spoils were retained, the team lost its lead in the GTP championship standings, received a 200-point penalty, lost all team and driver Michelin Endurance Cup points, and forfeited race prize money. The team also received a $50,000 fine, with team and entrant representative Mike Shank placed on probation until June 30, 2023. Team engineer Ryan McCarthy was suspended indefinitely and had his annual credential revoked.

Results
Class winners denoted in bold and with

References

24 Hours of Daytona
Daytona
2023 24 Hours of Daytona
2023 WeatherTech SportsCar Championship season